Khǒr Royal Cup, known as the Noi Cup before a 1963 name change, was a part of the Thai football league system, founded by the Football Association of Thailand in 1916.

Khǒr Royal Cup was the second-highest level of the Thai football league system from 1916 to 1995. The Khǒr Royal Cup was downgraded to the third-tier tournament in 1996, replaced by the Thai Division 1 League. In 2006, the tournament was further downgraded to the fourth-tier of Thai football due to the proposed merger of the Provincial League and Thai Premier League into one entity. In 2016, the Khǒr Royal Cup was combined with Khor Royal Cup and Ngor Royal Cup into Regional League Division 3, and the tournament's cup become a trophy for Thai Division 1 League.

Tournament format 
Each season or edition of the tournament was populated by clubs from its previous season which were neither promoted nor relegated, joined by the best four clubs promoted from the previous season of Khor Royal Cup. The first round was a group stage, with clubs divided into groups of 3 or 4 clubs. The winners and the runners-up of each group qualified to the knock-out stage. The finalists of the tournament were promoted to Regional League Division 2 for the following season, while the clubs which withdrew themselves from the tournament were relegated to Khor Royal Cup and Ngor Royal Cup for the following season.

List of winners 

Note

1: Both semi-finalists, Air Technical Training School and Pak Chong Sport School, were disqualified due to sending illegal players to the field; the final match of the 2015 Khǒr Royal Cup wasn't held, and Institute of Physical Education Samut Sakhon Campus automatically won the tournament, while Sena municipality qualified as the runner-up.

References 

Football competitions in Thailand